Trying to Kiss the Sun is a studio album by the German progressive rock band RPWL, released in 2002. It is the band's second studio album.

Track listing
 Trying to Kiss the Sun (3:45)
 Waiting for a Smile (7:04)
 I Don't Know (What It's Like) (4:32)
 Sugar for the Ape (5:03)
 Side by Side (8:35)
 You (6:49)
 Tell Me Why (5:08)
 Believe Me (5:14)
 Sunday Morning (4:29)
 Home Again (8:52)

Personnel
 Yogi Lang – vocals, keyboards
 Karlheinz Wallner – guitars
 Stephan Ebner – bass
 Phil Paul Rissettio – drums
 Andreas Wernthaler – keyboards

Extra personnel
 Chris Postl – Bass
 Stephan Caron – Coral sitar

Production
 Produced by Lang and Wallner
 Recorded and mixed at Farmlands
 Cover design by Stefan Wittmann
 Photos by Katharina Steinberger

External links
 The Official RPWL Homepage
 Album Info At Fan Site

2002 albums
RPWL albums